This is a list of alternative media supporting the views of the American political left. It covers alternative media sources including talk radio programs, TV shows, podcasts, investigative journalism, documentaries, blogs and other alternative media sources.

Alternative news services

AlterNet
Common Dreams
Consortium News
Current Affairs
Daily Kos
Democracy Now!
The Empire Files
The Grayzone
Indymedia
Jacobin
MintPress News
OpEdNews
The Raw Story
The Real News
Redneck Revolt
Reveal News
ShadowProof
Truthdig
Truthout
Vice News
Vox
US Uncut
World Socialist Web Site
The Young Turks
Z Communications

Alternative television networks

Free Speech TV
Link TV
Means TV
The Real News Network

Alternative television programs

John Oliver
Democracy Now!
Lee Camp (comedian)
The Young Turks
The Majority Report
Secular Talk

Alternative radio and online programs and podcasts

Vaush
Hasan Piker
ACLU podcast
Air America
Chapo Trap House
Current Affairs (podcast)
Common Censored
CounterSpin Radio (FAIR)
Democracy Now!
The Empire Files
Freethought Radio
Thom Hartmann Program
The Intercept - Podcasts & Spoken Edition
The Majority Report with Sam Seder
Media Roots Radio
Mintcast
Pacifica Radio
Ring of Fire
The West Wing Thing

Alternative publications

AlterNet, edited by Roxanne Cooper, acquired by The Raw Story
 The American Prospect, monthly, established 1990. Circulation 55,000.
 The Baffler, established 1988.
 CounterPunch, established 1993.
Current Affairs, bimonthly, established 2015.
 Dissent, quarterly, established 1954.
 Dollars & Sense, bimonthly, established 1974.
 Fifth Estate, quarterly, established 1965.
In These Times, monthly, established 1976. Circulation 17,000.
 Indy Week
 The Indypendent, published 17 times per year, established 2000.
 Jacobin, established 2010.
 Labor Notes, monthly, established 1979.
 Left Turn, quarterly.
 Liberation News, official newspaper of The Party for Socialism and Liberation
 Monthly Review, monthly, established 1949. Circulation 7,000.
 Mother Jones, bimonthly, established 1974.
 The Nation, weekly, established 1865. Circulation 190,000.
 The New Hampshire Gazette, fortnightly, press run 5,500.
 New Politics (magazine), semiannually, established 1986.
 People's World, official newspaper of The CPUSA, est. 1924
 The Progressive, monthly, established 1909.
Review of Radical Political Economics, quarterly, established 1968.
 Revolution, official newspaper of the Revolutionary Communist Party USA, est. 1979
 The Socialist, official publication of Socialist Party USA
 Socialist Appeal, English-language Trotskyist newspaper, International Marxist Tendency
 Texas Observer, established 1954.
 Utne Reader, bimonthly, established 1984. Circulation 150,000.
 Z Magazine, monthly established 1977.

See also

Alternative media (U.S. political right)
American Left
Progressive talk radio
Underground press
Breadtube
:Category:Modern liberal magazines published in the United States

References

Alternative media
Political mass media in the United States
Left-wing politics in the United States